The Hampshire Chronicle is a local, 
newspaper, based in Winchester, Hampshire, England. The first edition was published on 24 August 1772, making it one of the oldest publications in England.

The paper was founded by James Linden and was originally based in Southampton, moving to Winchester in 1778. From 1807 until 2004 its offices were at 57 High Street, Winchester. It is now based at 5 Upper Brook Street, Winchester.

For many years, the paper included national and international news, before trains allowed London papers to reach Hampshire. It now concentrates on news from Winchester and central Hampshire.

The paper has been published every week without fail since the first week. Publication days have varied, moving from Monday to Saturday in 1844, then to Friday in the 1970s and to Thursday in November 2005.

Photographs became a regular feature of the paper in the 1940s.

The paper currently comprises three weekly sections: the first broadsheet section covers news, classified advertising and sport. The second broadsheet section is for property advertising. The third, tabloid-size section is 7 Days, which covers arts, entertainment and motoring. There is also a monthly tabloid business supplement.

Until 19 April 1991, the Hampshire Chronicle was printed at its own offices, 57 High Street Winchester. From the following week it was printed at Portsmouth Printing and Publishing Ltd. It is now printed at Newsquest's Print Centre, in Test Lane, Redbridge, Southampton.

The Hampshire Chronicle is owned by Newsquest, which is the second largest publisher of regional and local newspapers in the UK, and is itself part of the US group Gannett.

Sister newspapers in the area include the Romsey Advertiser, Southern Daily Echo, Basingstoke Gazette, Andover Advertiser, and the Salisbury Journal.

References

External links
 

1772 establishments in England
Newspapers published in Hampshire
Newspapers published by Newsquest
Publications established in 1772